Diuris carinata, commonly known as the tall bee orchid, is a species of orchid that is endemic to the south-west of Western Australia. It has between four and six leaves and up to seven large, bright yellow flowers with reddish-brown markings.

Description
Flowering occurs in October and November.

Taxonomy and naming
Diuris carinata was first formally described by John Lindley in his 1840 book The Genera and Species of Orchidaceous Plants from a specimen collected by James Drummond near the Swan River. Its specific epithet (carinata) is a Latin word meaning "keeled", referring to the keel-like structure of parts of the flower.

Distribution and habitat
The tall bee orchid is found between Gingin and Mount Barker in the Jarrah Forest biogeographical region where it grows with sedges in swampy areas.

References

carinata
Endemic orchids of Australia
Orchids of Western Australia
Endemic flora of Western Australia
Plants described in 1840